The 2003 Dublin Women's Soccer League was the 10th season of the women's association football league featuring teams mainly from the Greater Dublin Area. The season began on 27 April and concluded on 28 September. UCD won their first DWSL title, the first of four successive league titles. They also completed a double after winning the 2003  FAI Women's Cup. In October 2003, with a team that included Grace Murray, Dundalk City won the DWSL Premier Cup, beating a St James's Gate team featuring Katie Taylor. City defeated Gate in the final 3–2 after extra time. The final was played at the home of Bluebell United and City were presented with the trophy by future Republic of Ireland women's national football team manager Susan Ronan.

Final table

Matches

References

2003
2002–03 domestic women's association football leagues
2003–04 domestic women's association football leagues
2003 in Republic of Ireland association football leagues
1